Anthony Pitts (born 10 October 1962) is an English actor, most notable for playing Archie Brooks in the long-running British soap Emmerdale Farm between 1983 and 1993.

Early life 
Pitts was born in Sheffield,  England. His family was working-class, his parents worked as a joiner and a midwife. Pitts originally intended to become a physician but ended up working as a car mechanic in his early career. He wrote a letter to the college to get out of college classes to become an actor. His family were livid at this.  During his time at Stannington College, Sheffield Barry Hines paid a visit looking for extras for his upcoming drama Looks and Smiles. Pitts was cast and soon upgraded to a bigger role in the production. He decided to follow his ambition to become an actor in 1983.

Emmerdale 
In 1983, Pitts was landed in the role of loveable young rogue Archie Brooks in the British soap opera Emmerdale. Pitts was chosen for the role by Kevin Laffan, who watched Pitts portray the title character in a theatrical adaptation of Nicholas Nickleby, and believed that Pitts' versatile acting ability and his strong Yorkshire accent, meant he was well suited for the role. The role was Pitts' very first role in a television series, and he first appeared on the show on 18 November 1983, and remained in the show for a total of ten years, involved in storylines that included his prison sentence in 1989 for setting fire to Seth Armstrong's property, becoming a suspect of whether or not he was the father of Elsa Feldmann's child in 1990, and his relationship with lesbian Zoe Tate in 1993.

In 1993, Pitts' character Archie was killed in the infamous Emmerdale plane crash. Pitts' last appearance on the show was on 30 December 1993.

Other work 
During his time away from Emmerdale, Pitts had notable guest appearances in shows including Casualty as Aidan Phillips in 1996, EastEnders as Cliff in 1996, The Bill as Chris Riley in 1999, The Royal as Alec Glazer in 2004 and Unforgiven in 2009 as Adam Boothroyd. Tony was the original choice for Terry Duckworth in Coronation Street, but Nigel Pivaro ended up playing the role instead. Pitts starred in Lilyhammer as Danny Croc Hammer, the brother of Duncan Hammer.

Pitts has appeared in the police drama Heartbeat on two occasions, the first time in 1998 as Carl Southall and the second time in 2005 as Brian Gilbert. In 2002, he appeared as DI Healey in the miniseries In Deep alongside Nick Berry and Stephen Tompkinson.

He is now a screenwriter, as well as an actor.

Pitts appeared in Scott & Bailey on ITV1/ITV1HD as Adrian Scott (the husband of Lesley Sharp's character, DC Janet Scott). He also had a small role in the 2012 film War Horse. In 2012 Pitts starred in the third episode of Dirk Gently as Robbie Glover. In 2012 he also appeared as the Chief Superintendent in the Sherlock episode "The Reichenbach Falls". In 2013 he appeared as Sergeant Moss in the BBC drama series Peaky Blinders. Pitts played Captain Patero in Rogue One: A Star Wars Story in 2016. He also appeared as Detective Chief Superintendent Les Hargreaves in the 2014 second series of BBC's Line of Duty, made an appearance in the series finale of series four in 2017, and then appeared in series five in 2019.  From 2017 he appeared in two seasons of the series Jamestown as Edgar Massinger. Pitts also appeared in Wild Bill on ITV in 2019.

Filmography

Film

Television

References

External links 
 

1962 births
English male soap opera actors
Living people
Male actors from Sheffield